Kalu Devi Bishwakarma (surname also abbreviated to BK or B.K.) is a Nepali dalit politician and a member of the House of Representatives of the federal parliament of Nepal. She was elected under the proportional representation system from Kailali District representing Federal Socialist Forum Nepal.

She claimed to have experienced difficulties renting an apartment in Kathmandu following her election to parliament, because of the prejudice of landlords against dalits. Speaking in parliament, of her experience, she said that the word Dalit should be expunged from the records and replaced by Artisans.

References

Living people
Nepal MPs 2017–2022
Dalit politicians
Loktantrik Samajwadi Party, Nepal politicians
People's Socialist Party, Nepal politicians
1958 births